The Dog and the Diamonds is a 1953 British family drama film directed by Ralph Thomas and starring Kathleen Harrison, George Coulouris, and Geoffrey Sumner.

External links

1953 films
1953 drama films
1950s English-language films
British drama films
Films directed by Ralph Thomas
Films produced by Peter Rogers
1950s British films